Atascadero Creek is an  north-flowing stream in Sonoma County, California, United States, which empties into Green Valley Creek.

Course

It descends to the north, flowing under Barnett Valley Road, Watertrough Road, and Bodega Highway. Atascadero Creek is the central channel of the Atascadero Wetland system, designated by the Army Corps of Engineers. It falls under increased protection with the 2015 “new rule” augmenting the 1972 Federal Clean Water Act. As a tributary to Green Valley Creek, Atascadero Creek and wetlands are part of the greater Russian River watershed.

Habitat and pollution
As of 2000, Atascadero Creek and its major tributaries supported steelhead trout and California freshwater shrimp. The Atascadero is also historic spawning habitat for threatened steelhead salmon (oncorhynchus mykiss) and endangered coho salmon (oncorhynchus kisutch). Coho salmon are listed among the top ten endangered species under the federal Endangered Species Act. In 2001 a captive breeding program was established below Warm Springs Dam to restore their dwindling population.

See also
 List of watercourses in the San Francisco Bay Area

References

External links

 1995 stream survey

Rivers of Sonoma County, California
Rivers of Northern California
Tributaries of the Russian River (California)